Harpalus cyrtonotoides is a species of ground beetle in the subfamily Harpalinae. It was described by Notman in 1919.

References

cyrtonotoides
Beetles described in 1919